Ikotos is a town in Eastern Equatoria of South Sudan, headquarters of Ikotos County. The town is home to the Lango people, who have a total population of 25,000 - 30,000 people in Ikotos county and elsewhere, and speak dialects of the Lotuko language.

References

Populated places in Eastern Equatoria